Asterolasia buxifolia is a species of spindly shrub in the family Rutaceae and is endemic to a restricted area of eastern New South Wales. It has star-shaped hairs on its stems, leathery leaves and yellow flowers arranged singly in leaf axils with star-shaped hairs on the back of the petals.

Description
The upper surface of the leaves is glabrous but the lower surface is covered with star-shaped hairs.

Taxonomy
This species was first described in 1863 by George Bentham who published the description in Flora Australiensis.

Distribution and habitat
Asterolasia buxifolia is only known from a single site near the River Lett where it grows among granite rocks in forest in the Central Tablelands of eastern New South Wales.

Conservation status
This plant was only rediscovered in 2000 and little is known about it. It is listed as "endangered" under the New South Wales Government Biodiversity Conservation Act 2016. The main threats to the species include weed invasion, habitat disturbance and grazing by rabbits, hares and livestock.

References

buxifolia
Sapindales of Australia
Flora of New South Wales
Plants described in 1863
Taxa named by George Bentham